Mitwaba is a city in the Haut-Katanga province of the Democratic Republic of the Congo. As of 2012, it had an estimated population of 4,332.

On December 24, 1947, the first fatal airliner crash in present-day Congo occurred near Mitwaba. A Lockheed Lodestar on a Sabena flight from the city to Manono went down inverted after engine issues, killing all 5 onboard.

References 

Populated places in Haut-Katanga Province